The 1902 Ohio Green and White football team represented University of Ohio in the 1902 college football season as an independent. Led by Harold Monosmith in his first and only year as head coach, the Green and White compiled a record of 0–6–1, being outscored 0–165.

Schedule

References

Ohio
Ohio Bobcats football seasons
Ohio Green and White football
College football winless seasons